Happy Flight is a 1949 Soviet musical comedy film directed by Vladimir Nemolyayev and starring Nikolay Kryuchkov, Mikhail Zharov and Vera Orlova. It was made by the Soviet Union's domint studio Mosfilm. A young truck driver develops both a professional and romantic rivalry with a fellow driver.

Cast
 Nikolay Kryuchkov as Driver Sinichkin  
 Mikhail Zharov as Driver Zachyosov  
 Vera Orlova as Fenya  
 Olga Vikland as Dispatcher Telegina 
 Vladimir Popov as Garage foreman  
 Anatoly Gorunov as Alexey Trofimov 
 Tatiana Peltzer as Grandmother Feni 
 Svetlana Nemolyaeva as Girl
 Emmanuil Geller as Magician  
 Evgeniy Leonov as Fireman   
 Elena Ponsova
 Elena Tchaikovsky
 Ludmila Genik-Chirkova
 Alexey Alexeev

External links

1949 films
Soviet musical comedy films
1949 musical comedy films
1940s Russian-language films
Trucker films
Soviet black-and-white films